Qasemabad-e Khanlar Khan (also Romanized as Qāsemābād-e Khānlar Khān) is a village in Kharqan Rural District, Bastam District, Shahrud County, Semnan Province, Iran. At the 2006 census, its population was 398, in 118 families.

References 

Populated places in Shahrud County